Zumanjaro: Drop of Doom is an amusement ride located at Six Flags Great Adventure in Jackson Township, New Jersey. The  attraction is attached to the Kingda Ka roller coaster and opened as the tallest drop tower ride in the world in 2014.

History 
On May 21, 2005, Kingda Ka opened to the public and became the tallest and fastest roller coaster in the world at that time, overtaking both world records from Top Thrill Dragster at Cedar Point.

Rumors that Six Flags Great Adventure would be adding a drop tower attached to Kingda Ka, similar to Lex Luthor: Drop of Doom at Six Flags Magic Mountain, emerged in February 2012. In August, theme park enthusiast website Screamscape mentioned that Rolling Thunder may be removed at the end of the 2013 season.

On August 29, 2013, Six Flag's chairman, president, and CEO, Jim Reid-Anderson, officially announced Zumanjaro: Drop of Doom for the 2014 season, which would be attached to Kingda Ka, along with the other new rides to be built at other Six Flags parks. In the press release, it was confirmed that Rolling Thunder would close on September 8, 2013, and be demolished. The new ride is inspired by the park's 2013 addition, Safari Off Road Adventure. The area adjacent to the Zumanjaro: Drop of Doom would be a new habitat for African baboons, which will replace the 2011 addition, Safari Discoveries.

On April 1, 2014, the final track piece for the drop tower ride was erected into place by park construction crews. The ride opened to the public on July 4, 2014.

Opening 
Zumanjaro: Drop of Doom was first slated to open originally during the Memorial Day Weekend of 2014. Two weeks before opening the new attraction along with the reopening of Kingda Ka, Six Flags Great Adventure delayed its opening due to the weather during the construction of the ride with its extreme heights. Despite the delayed opening in late May, Kingda Ka reopened only during the weekends of the summer until the opening of the drop tower. On June 26, 2014, Six Flags Great Adventure announced the opening of the new attraction for the Fourth of July holiday weekend. Hours before the soft-opening of Zumanjaro: Drop of Doom on July 2, 2014, the theme park delayed the opening of the drop tower again for the second time. Six Flags Great Adventure stated that the state of New Jersey had not granted the park the operating permit to open the new drop tower. However, two days after the second delayed opening, the park opened the ride to the public on July 4, 2014.

VR 
In 2017, virtual reality headsets were added as an optional feature on the ride, which were Samsung Gear VR headsets powered by Oculus. Riders wearing the headsets would experience a 360-degree, 3D simulation of being in a futuristic helicopter that was fending off an attack by mutant spiders.

Ride experience 

Zumanjaro: Drop of Doom consists of three free-fall drop attractions, each mounted to a lateral flank of the Kingda Ka structure. Each of the three towers features a single floorless gondola seating eight abreast. Before riding, riders queue along a new African baboon habitat. Riders are harnessed in by over-the-shoulder restraints.

Statistics 
  tall
 
 Ascends in 30 seconds
 Drops in 10 seconds
 Decelerates at 3.5g
 Three towers built on Kingda Ka
 Eight-person gondolas with 24 riders per cycle
 Three gondolas ascend simultaneously but drop independently
  of wire ropes and cables were used to build Zumanjaro, which is equal to 617 jumping ropes.
  of guide rail (track)
  of linear magnetic brakes
  of drum/motor to lift riders to the top
 161 different kinds of bolts and a grand total of 26,502 bolts
 Construction crews added  of steel structural reinforcing columns to Kingda Ka to support Zumanjaro.

Records 
Zumanjaro: Drop of Doom holds the record for the tallest and fastest drop tower ride in the world, taking the record from Lex Luthor: Drop of Doom at Six Flags Magic Mountain on July 4, 2014.

See also 
 Lex Luthor: Drop of Doom and The Giant Drop, two other Intamin drop towers that are attached to existing roller coasters

References 

Amusement rides introduced in 2014
Six Flags attractions
Six Flags Great Adventure
Amusement rides manufactured by Intamin
Drop tower rides
2014 establishments in New Jersey